Dinosaur man may refer to either:

 A hypothetical sapient dinosaur such as the dinosauroid, conjectured by  Dale Russell in 1982
Stegron the Dinosaur Man in the Marvel Comics universe

Other humanoid dinosaurs in fiction include:

Two species in the Doctor Who universe
 Silurians
 Sea Devil (Doctor Who)
The Sleestak in Land of the Lost
The Voth in the Star Trek universe

See also
Reptilian humanoid